John Earls is an English music journalist, broadcaster, and columnist, best known for his work as chief writer and editor of Planet Sound on ITV's and Channel 4's Teletext on analogue television and online. He has contributed widely in UK media by writing for the News of the World, When Saturday Comes, and the Sunday People amongst other publications.

Early career
Born on 25 August 1972, Earls grew up in Milton Keynes. He wrote reader reviews for Blue Suede Views on ORACLE and for Doctor Who Magazine in 1987 at the age of 14. He started writing professionally as a freelance in 1990 for football magazines 90 Minutes and, after completing a month's work experience there, When Saturday Comes. After completing a year's journalism course at Harlow College in 1992, Earls became a showbiz interviewer for The Sunday People, a post he left in 1999. Two months later, he became a teen entertainment interviewer for Teletext, the successor to ORACLE.

Planet Sound and beyond
Earls became a writer for Teletext's music section, Planet Sound, 18 months after joining the company. He was named chief editor of the publication in 2001 and was at the post until its end in January 2010. He wrote the whole of the magazine, including news, single and album reviews, and features. Earls became synonymous with Planet Sound and his work was often cited by other publications. He wrote the Rated music column for the News of the World until its closure in 2011. During his career, Earls has interviewed many acclaimed musicians. He is considered by the BBC as one of the most influential and impartial UK-based music critics and broadcasters of recent times. Earls has set up a record label, WET, with friends. He also makes irregular appearances as a stand-up on the London comedy circuit, and has shared bills with comics including Brian Damage, Ross Noble, Paul Foot, Paul Chowdhry and Iain Lee.

Music reviews
Earls lists the following albums as ones readers should own, apart from "the obvious great ones they'd already own":
 Pet Shop Boys – Very
 My Life Story – Greetings from Mornington Crescent
 The Delgados – The Great Eastern
 The Teardrop Explodes – Wilder
 The National – Alligator

References

External links
John Earls at Planet Sound
Interview with John Earls at The Music Fix

1972 births
Living people
English writers
English music journalists
English sports journalists
Alumni of Harlow College
English male non-fiction writers